Kazi Monirul Islam (born 2 January 1952) is a Bangladesh Awami League politician and the incumbent Jatiya Sangsad member representing the Dhaka-5 constituency.

Career 
Islam is the president of Jatrabari Thana Awami League. After the death of Habibur Rahman Mollah on 6 May 2020, he was elected as a Jatiya Sangsad member of the vacant seat in the by-election held on 17 October 2020.

References 

Living people
1952 births
Awami League politicians
11th Jatiya Sangsad members
Place of birth missing (living people)